Terakado (written:  or ) is a Japanese surname. Notable people with the surname include:

, Japanese comedian
, Japanese classical violinist and conductor
Terakado Seiken (寺門 静軒, 1796  1868), Japanese writer and Confucian scholar

See also
16528 Terakado, a main-belt asteroid

Japanese-language surnames